"I'm Wastin' My Tears on You" is a song written by Frank Harford, and recorded in 1944 by Tex Ritter.  The song was the first of three number ones on the Juke Box Folk records chart.  "I"m Wastin' My Tears on You" stayed at number one for six weeks with a total of twenty weeks on the chart.  The B-side of the song, entitled "There's a New Moon Over My Shoulder", peaked at number two on the same chart.

References

1944 songs
1944 singles
Tex Ritter songs
Capitol Records singles